Saïd Razzouki is a member of the so-called Mocro Maffia, a gang of Moroccan-Dutch criminals. As of 8 February 2020, he is thought to be the adjutant of Ridouan Taghi. As of 8 February 2020, he is suspected of involvement in several murders. The Netherlands offered €100,000 ($110,000 at that time) for information on his whereabouts, an amount equal to information on his boss Taghi. This was the highest amount ever offered by the Dutch government for such information.

After fleeing to Colombia, where he managed to hide for multiple years and enjoyed the protection of the cartel Clan del Golfo, he was arrested by a combined effort of FBI, DEA and Colombian police forces. He was extradited to the Netherlands in December 2021.

References 

Year of birth missing (living people)
Living people
Dutch gangsters
Mocro Maffia